Pseudoxanthobacter soli is a Gram negative, aerobic rod-shaped and nitrogen fixing bacterium which has been isolated from soil from an agricultural research field station in Kaohsiung County in Taiwan.

References

Further reading

External links
Type strain of Pseudoxanthobacter soli at BacDive -  the Bacterial Diversity Metadatabase	

Hyphomicrobiales
Bacteria described in 2008